KWLO (1580 AM) is a radio station serving the Provo/Springville  area. The station is owned by Iglesia Pentecostal Víspera del Fin, broadcasting a Spanish Contemporary Christian format.

KWLO shares towers with KOVO 960, located just southwest of Provo near Interstate 15. K260DS, 99.9 FM is located atop West Mountain, west of Springville.

History
KWLO started as a construction permit owned by RAMS III in 2009, however did not make it to air for another eight years. On January 1, 2019, KWLO changed its format to Classic hits.
In 2019, Rams III sold KWLO-Provo, and 1580 Utah's Goat and the translator station K260DS $300,000 to Utah County Radio company called Lucky Dog Broadcasting and Lucky Dog Broadcasting owners Frank and Melanie Mueller. Also in 2019, Valleydale Broadcasting LLC sold KPVO-Fountain Green and 99.9 Utah's Goat $25,000 to Lucky Dog Broadcasting. As of November 16, 2021, the 1580 and 99.9 frequencies began broadcasting a repeating audio loop telling listeners that "Utah's Goat" had moved to 96.7 KQMB. KQMB previously aired a soft adult contemporary format branded as "Kosy 96.7", now it is a classic hit format branded as "Utah's Goat 96.7". Lucky Dog Broadcasting had been leasing the 1580 and 99.9 frequencies from RAMS III under a local marketing agreement (LMA); and due to the COVID-19 pandemic, Lucky Dog was unable to consummate the sale of the stations from RAMS III. The new owner of 1580 and 99.9 was scheduled to take over operations of those frequencies beginning December 1, 2021. However, the transfer of station ownership was delayed by several months. Programming from Iglesia Pentecostal Vispera Del Fin began airing on KWLO on April 13, 2022. On February 11, 2022, KWLO and K260DS were sold to Iglesia Pentecostal Vispera Del Fin for $300,000. KPVO-Fountain Green was also sold to Iglesia Pentecostal Vispera Del Fin for $25,000 in a separate transaction, now broadcasting a Spanish Contemporary Christian format.

References

External links

Radio stations established in 2018
2018 establishments in Utah
WLO
Classic hits radio stations in the United States